Miguel Herz-Kestranek (born April 3, 1948) is an Austrian actor and author.

Life 
Miguel Herz-Kestranek was born the son of an industry and art family from the former Viennese Jewish upper middle class on April 3, 1948 in St. Gallen, Canton of St. Gallen, Switzerland.

Born in a Jewish family and raised as a Christian, Miguel Herz-Kestranek established himself as a "Jewish Buddhist" through his friendship with the Buddhist monk Banthe Seelawansa Thero, who lives in Vienna.

Miguel Herz-Kestranek has been married to Miriam since September 2016 and has a daughter, Theresa, who is an alternative dog trainer in Lower Austria from an earlier relationship with the Austrian actress Dorothea Parton.

Growing up by the lake, Miguel Herz-Kestranek is a passionate sailor and founded the former Austrian O-dinghy association in the 1980s. In addition to many regattas, he also participated in the European O-Dinghy Championships in 2005 on Lake Wolfgang. As early as 1984 he donated a prize named after him.

Miguel Herz-Kestranek lives in seclusion, alternating between Vienna and Lake Wolfgang.

Volunteering and memberships 

 1993 Founder and director of the Österreichischer Filmschauspielerverband (VÖFS), president since 2003
 1993 to 1995 member board of the Dachverband der Österreichischen Filmschaffenden
 2000 to 2011 vice president of the Österreichischer P.E.N.-Club
 since 2000 curation member of the DÖW of the Dokumentationsarchiv des österreichischen Widerstandes
 since 2000 founder and president of the Gesellschaft zur Förderung Österreichischer Advent-Kultur
 since 2004 advisory board member of the Österreichische Gesellschaft für Europapolitik (ÖGfE)
 since 2008 vice president of the Österreichische Gesellschaft für Exilforschung (ÖGE)
 2012 founder member of the BürgerInnenforum Europa 2020

Filmography (selection) 
 1974: Fräulein Else
 1974: Perahim – die zweite Chance
 1975: Die Alpensaga
 1975: Der selige Herr aus dem Parlament
 1976: Die liebe Familie
 1976: Abschiede (Hochzeitsreise)

 1978: Die belgische Republik
 1978: 1815 – Der Wiener Kongress
 1978: Tod eines Vaters
 1978: Das Licht der Gerechten
 1978: Alles Leben ist Chemie
 1979: Konzert im 7. Stock
 1979: Das Geheimnis der alten Dame
 1979: Breakthrough
 1979: Erbschaft
 1979: Die Alpensaga
 1980: Attentat in Gastein
 1980: Klausenberger Geschichten
 1981: Der Repräsentant
 1991: Anna Berg
 1981: Der Narr von Wien
 1981: Familie Merian
 1981: Firefox
 1982: Die Gnade der Fürsten
 1982: Die liebe Familie
 1982: Familie Merian
 1982: Klausenberger Geschichten
 1982: Der exekutierte Mensch
 1983: Capri – Musik die dich entfernt
 1983: Kudlich
 1983: The Devil's Lieutenant
 1983: Wagner
 1983: Goldene Zeiten II
 1984: Weltuntergang
 1984: Der Turm
 1984: Flucht ohne Ende
 1984: Tatort: Der Mann mit den Rosen (as Assistent Franz Ullmann)
 1985: Tatort: Fahrerflucht (as Assistent Franz Ullmann)
 1985: Tatort: Nachtstreife (as Assistent Franz Ullmann)
 1985: Tal der Pappeln
 1985: '38 – Vienna Before the Fall
 1985: Alles Komödie
 1985: Merken Sie sich dieses Gesicht
 1986: Ein Porträt für Mario
 1986: Wie den eigenen Sohn
 1986: Marionetten
 1986: Eine Minute dunkel macht uns nicht blind
 1986: Moselbrück
 1986: Tatort: Der Schnee vom vergangenen Jahr (as ermittelnder Journalist Lutinsky)
 1987: Bravissimo
 1987: Hafendetektiv
 1987: Der Schatz des Kaisers
 1987: Ein Mann nach meinem Herzen
 1988: In Zeiten wie diesen
 1988: Kaffeehausgeschichte
 1988: Wie würden Sie entscheiden
 1989: Moselbrück
 1989: Wenn das die Nachbarn wüßten
 1989: Eurocops
 1989: The Strauss Dynasty
 1990: 
 1990–2000: SOKO 5113 (TV series; three episodes)
 1990: Der Erfolg Ihres Lebens
 1991: The Mixer
 1991: Wolfgang Amadeus Mozart
 1992: Der Diamant des Geisterkönigs
 1992: 
 1992: Und morgen der Opernball
 1993: Wirklich schade um Papa
 1993: Familie Merian
 1993: Im Kreis der Iris
 1993: Peter Strohm
 1993: Der exekutierte Mensch
 1994: Radetzkymarsch
 1994: Ein unvergessenes Wochenende in den Schweizer Alpen
 1994: Hochzeitsreisen
 1994: Die Nacht der Nächte
 1994: Fitness
 1994: Geschichten aus Österreich
 1994: Iris & Violetta
 1994: Tonino und Toinette
 1995: Alice auf der Flucht
 1995: Daniel und Philipp – Das Wunder der Liebe
 1995: Das Kapital
 1995: Drei in fremden Betten
 1995: Ein Mann in der Krise
 1995: Schlosshotel Orth
 1996: Die Unzertrennlichen
 1996: Die Eisenstraße
 1996: Klinik unter Palmen
 1996: Eifersucht – eine tödliche Falle
 1996: Drei Tage Angst
 1996: Weißblaue Geschichten
 1996: Katrin ist die Beste
 1997: Sardtsch
 1997: Infoline
 1997: Alle meine Töchter
 1997: Derrick
 1997: Kommissar Rex
 1998: JETS – Leben am Limit
 1998: Kanadische Träume
 1998: Weißblaue Geschichten
 1998: Drei Tage Angst (TV film)
 1999: Der Bulle von Tölz: Tod am Hahnenkamm
 1999: Rosamunde Pilcher – Möwen im Wind
 1999: SOKO 5113
 1999: Sophie – Sissis kleine Schwester
 1999: Kanadische Träume – eine Familie
 2000: Donna Leon – Vendetta
 2000: Alle meine Töchter
 2000: Der Bestseller
 2000: Schlosshotel Orth
 2000: Sinan Toprak ist der Unbestechliche
 2000: Stimme des Herzens
 2001: Liebe unter weißen Segeln
 2001: 
 2001: Die Kumpel
 2001: Uprising
 2002: Das unbezähmbare Herz
 2002: Die Rosenheim-Cops
 2002: Zwei Seiten der Liebe
 2002: Mit Herz und Handschellen
 2002: The Poet
 2003: Mai Storia D‘Amore in Cucina
 2003: Alles Glück dieser Erde
 2003: Mädchen, Mädchen
 2003: Mein Mann, meine Liebe und ich
 2003: Wilde Engel
 2003: Der Fürst und das Mädchen
 2004: Weißblaue Wintergeschichten
 2004: Alpenglühen
 2004: Der letzte Zeuge
 2004: Die Patriarchin
 2004: Klimt
 2004: Mit Herz und Handschellen
 2004: Rose unter Dornen
 2005: Der letzte Zeuge
 2005: Agathe kann’s nicht lassen
 2005: Der Fürst und das Mädchen
 2005: Die Spur im Schnee
 2005: Im Tal der wilden Rosen
 2005: Liebes Leid und Lust
 2005: Rosamunde Pilcher – Segel der Liebe
 2005: Weißblaue Wintergeschichten
 2006: Im Tal der wilden Rosen – Was das Herz befiehlt
 2006: Herzdamen
 2006: 
 2006: La Freccia Nera
 2006: König der Herzen
 2007: Utta Danella – Tanz auf dem Regenbogen
 2007: 
 2007: Doctor’s Diary
 2007: Inga Lindström – Ein Wochenende in Söderholm
 2007: SOKO Donau
 2007: Zodiak – Der Horoskop-Mörder
 2008: Der Tote im Elchwald
 2008: Der Fall des Lemming
 2008: Johanna – Köchin der Leidenschaft
 2008: SOKO Leipzig
 2008: Zwei Ärzte sind einer zuviel
 2009: Ausgerechnet Afrika
 2009: Der Engelmacher
 2009: Die Wanderhure
 2009: Nanga Parbat
 2010: Das Traumhotel – Sri Lanka
 2010: Alarm für Cobra 11 – Die Autobahnpolizei
 2010: Pius XII.
 2011: 
 2011: Der Meineidbauer
 2011: The Gold Quest: A Journey to Panama
 2011: Um Himmels Willen
 2012: Fuchs und Gans
 2012: The Other Wife
 2012: Helden – Wenn dein Land dich braucht
 2013: Angélique
 2013: Um Himmels Willen
 2015: Ein starkes Team: Beste Freunde
 2017: Die Ketzerbraut
 2017: Das doppelte Lottchen
 2018: Lena Lorenz – Zwei Väter
 2019: Vorstadtweiber
 2019: Meiberger – im Kopf des Täters
 2019: Schnell ermittelt

Awards 

 Wahl zum beliebtesten Tatort-Kommissar in Österreich durch die Leser der Kronenzeitung (1986)
 Österreichisches Ehrenkreuz für Wissenschaft und Kunst (Oktober 2000)
 Kulturehrenzeichen der Stadt Bad Ischl (2006)
 Romy-Nominierung Kategorie „beliebtester Schauspieler“ (Mai 2008)
 Botschafter der Tracht/Konrad Mautner-Preis (2008)
 Großes Ehrenzeichen für Verdienste um das Bundesland Niederösterreich (2013)

Publications 
 Oh käm´s auf mich nicht an! Verlag NÖ Pressehaus, 1987
 Gereimte Sammelschüttler. Mit Wortspenden geistreicher Schüttelgenossen. Brandstätter, Wien 1995, 
 Also hab ich nur mich selbst! Stefan Herz-Kestranek – Stationen eines großbürgerlichen Emigranten 1938 bis 1945. (gemeinsam mit Marie-Theres Arnbom), Böhlau, Wien 1997, 
 Mit Éjzes bin ich versehen: Erlebtes, Erdachtes und Erlachtes. (2. Auflage) Ibera, Wien 1998, 
 Mir zugeschüttelt. Neueste und allerneueste Schüttelreime aus österreichischem Volksmund von Apetlon bis Zürs. Brandstätter, Wien 1999, 
 Georg Terramare: Uns ward ein Kind geboren. Wiener Weihnachtslegenden. Miguel Herz-Kestranek (Herausgeber), Ibera, Wien 2000, 
 wos wea wo waun wia en wean: einbligge in de weana sö. Ibera, Wien 2002, 
 Wie der Auer Michl einen Christbaum holen ging. Ibera, Wien 2002, 
 Winterliches & Weihnachtliches aus dem alten Wien. Ibera, Wien 2005, 
 Wortmeldung – Polemiken, Pointen, Poesien. Ibera, Wien 2007, 
 Anny Robert: Herrlich ist's in Tel Aviv – aus der Wiener Perspektiv'. Erinnerungen. Daniela Ellmauer, Miguel Herz-Kestranek und Albert Lichtblau (Herausgeber), Böhlau, Wien 2006, 
 In welcher Sprache träumen Sie? Österreichische Lyrik aus Exil und Widerstand. Anthologie, Miguel Herz-Kestranek, Konstantin Kaiser, Daniela Striegl (Herausgeber), Verlag der Theodor Kramer Gesellschaft, Wien 2007, 
 Die Frau von Pollak oder: Wie mein Vater jüdische Witze erzählte. Ibera Verlag, Wien 2011, 
Lachertorten-mit Schlag! 40 Jahre Lachprogramme. Ibera Verlag, Wien 2019,

External links 

 Official website 
 Literature from and about Miguel Herz-Kestranek in the German National Library
 Miguel Herz-Kestranek on IMDb

References

Living people
Austrian actors
1948 births